The subdivisions of Croatia on the first level are the 20 counties (županija, pl. županije) and one city-county (grad, "city").

On the second level these are municipalities (općina, pl. općine) and cities (grad, pl. gradovi). Both of these types of subdivisions encompass one or multiple settlements (naselje, pl. naselja) which are not public or legal entities, the Croatian Bureau of Statistics consider them as non-administrative units – human settlements, similar to the United States census designated places. As parts of the cities or the (larger) municipalities they may form city districts (gradski kotari or gradske četvrti) or local committee areas (mjesni odbori). Small municipalities usually consist of only one settlement.

Current (since 1992)

Counties (21)
 Bjelovar-Bilogora
 Brod-Posavina
 Dubrovnik-Neretva
 Istria
 Karlovac
 Koprivnica-Križevci
 Krapina-Zagorje
 Lika-Senj
 Međimurje
 Osijek-Baranja
 Požega-Slavonia
 Primorje-Gorski Kotar
 Šibenik-Knin
 Sisak-Moslavina
 Split-Dalmatia
 Varaždin
 Virovitica-Podravina
 Vukovar-Syrmia
 Zadar
 Zagreb
 City of Zagreb
Cities and Municipalities (556)
City districts and Local committee areas
Settlements (6,749) (non-legal, non-public entities)

1975–1990

Unions of Municipalities (zajednica općina, pl. zajednice općina) (11), including City of Zagreb Union of Municipalities (Zagreb metropolitan area) and City of Split Union of Municipalities (Split metropolitan area)
Municipalities (općina, pl. općine)
Local communities (mjesna zajednica, pl. mjesne zajednice)
Settlements (non legal or public entities)

1967–1975
Municipalities
Settlements (non legal or public entities)

1952–1967
 Districts (kotar, pl. kotari) and Cities (grad, pl. gradovi)
 City municipalities (Townships) and Municipalities (gradske općine and općine)
 Settlements (non legal or public entities)

1947–1952
Oblasts
Bjelovar
Karlovac
Osijek
Rijeka
Split
Zagreb
Districts
People's Committee Areas (mjesni narodni odbori)

1945–1947
Oblasts
Circles (okrug, pl. okruzi)
Districts 
People's Committee Areas (mjesni narodni odbor, pl. mjesni narodni odbori) - village people's committees and, raion people's committee, town/city people's committee

N.B. Until 1963 all subdivisions were governed by the elected people's committees. From 1963 to 1992 these were administered by the respective (elected) assemblies.

1941–1945

Independent State of Croatia

Counties (22)
Baranja
Bilogora
Bribir and Sidraga
Cetina
Dubrava
Gora
Hum
Krbava – Psat
Lašva and Glaž
Lika and Gacka
Livac and Zapolje
Modruš
Pliva and Rama
Pokupje
Posavje
Prigorje
Sana and Luka
Usora and Soli
Vinodol and Podgorje
Vrhbosna
Vuka
Zagorje
Zagreb
Districts
Municipalities
Cadastral municipalities (katastarske općine) (non legal or public entities, non local authorities)

1929–1941

 Banovinas
Banovina of Croatia
Sava Banovina
Littoral Banovina
Districts
Cities and municipalities
Cadastral municipalities (non legal or public entities, non local authorities)

1922–1929

 Oblasts
Oblast of Dubrovnik
Oblast of Karlovac
Oblast of Osijek
Oblast of Split
Oblast of Vukovar (partially)
Oblast of Zagreb
Districts
Cities and municipalities
Cadastral municipalities (non legal or public entities, non local authorities)

Kingdom of Croatia-Slavonia (1868–1922)

Counties
Modruš-Rijeka County
Zagreb County
Varaždin County
Bjelovar-Križevci County
Virovitica County
Požega County
Syrmia County
Lika-Krbava County
Districts
Cities and municipalities
Cadastral municipalities (non legal or public entities, non local authorities)

Medieval Croatian Kingdom

Counties
Livno
Cetina
Imotski
Pliva
Pesenta
Klis
Bribir
Nin
Knin
Sidraga
Luka
Gacka
Krbava
Lika

See also
Counties of Croatia
Croatian cities
Municipalities of Croatia
NUTS of Croatia
ISO 3166-2 codes of Croatia
Administrative divisions of the Banovina of Croatia
Counties of the Independent State of Croatia
Former counties of Croatia (in Kingdom of Croatia-Slavonia)

References

 
Croatia